Terminalia macroptera is a species of flowering plant in the Combretaceae known by the Hausa common name kwandari. It is native to Africa, where it can be found in Benin, Burkina Faso, Ghana, Senegal, Sudan, Uganda, and Nigeria.

Uses 
In several African countries Terminalia macroptera is used in traditional herbal medicine for infectious diseases, tuberculosis, hepatitis, and dysentery. Extracts of the plant have shown in vitro activity against Helicobacter pylori and Neisseria gonorrhoeae.

Parts of the plant are also used to make dye and perfumes.

Chemical constituents 
The leaves contain chlorogenic acid, quercetin, isoorientin, the ellagitannins chebulagic acid, chebulinic acid, punicalagin, and terflavin A, gallic acid, and ellagic acid. Different methylated ellagic acid derivatives and the triterpenoid terminolic acid can be found in the heartwood.

The plant also contains the hydrolyzable tannins isoterchebulin and 4,6-O-isoterchebuloyl-d-glucose which have a tetraphenylic acid moiety (isoterchebulic acid).

References

External links

macroptera
Flora of Africa
Plants used in traditional African medicine